Bodianus cylindriatus is a species of wrasse. It is found in the Western Pacific Ocean.

Size

References

Fish of the Pacific Ocean
cylindriatus
Taxa named by Shigeho Tanaka
Fish described in 1930